Beatriz Gomes (born 31 December 1979) is a Portuguese sprint canoer and marathon canoeist who has competed since the late first decade of the 21st century. She won a bronze medal in the K-4 200 m event at the 2009 ICF Canoe Sprint World Championships in Dartmouth.  She was World Champion in the K1 Marathon event in 2009.

Gomes also competed in the K-2 500 m event at the 2008 Summer Olympics in Beijing, but was eliminated in the semifinals.

At the 2012 Summer Olympics, Gomes and her teammate Joana Vasconcelos reached the final of K-2 500 m, as did Gomes and the Portuguese K-4 500 m team.

References

Canoe09.ca profile
Sports-reference.com profile

1979 births
Canoeists at the 2008 Summer Olympics
Canoeists at the 2012 Summer Olympics
Living people
Olympic canoeists of Portugal
Portuguese female canoeists
ICF Canoe Sprint World Championships medalists in kayak
Canoeists at the 2015 European Games
European Games competitors for Portugal